Winning Post 7 Maximum 2008 (ウイニングポスト7 マキシマム2008) is a multiplatform horse racing simulator published by Koei for the PlayStation 2, PlayStation 3, Wii and Microsoft Windows It was released only in Japan on March 13, 2008. The game is the sequel to Winning Post 7 Maximum 2007.

See also
Winning Post 7 Maximum 2007

Other Versions
Winning Post 7 2009
Winning Post World 2010

References

External links
Official website Temp. 2008
Official website Temp. 2009
Official website Temp. 2010

2008 video games
Horse racing video games
Japan-exclusive video games
Koei games
PlayStation 2 games
PlayStation 3 games
Video games developed in Japan
Wii games
Windows games

ja:ウイニングポスト7